The following is a list of notable deaths in March 28-2000.

Entries for each day are listed alphabetically by surname. A typical entry lists information in the following sequence:
 Name, age, country of citizenship at birth, subsequent country of citizenship (if applicable), reason for notability, cause of death (if known), and reference.

March 2000

1
Raymond Badin, 71, French gymnast and Olympian.
Odell Barnes, 31, American convict, execution by lethal injection.
Jesper Høm, 68, Danish photographer and film director.
Vlastimir Peričić, 72, Serbian composer.
Lionel Salter, 85, English pianist, conductor, and writer.
Sumie Tanaka, 91, Japanese screenwriter and playwright.

2
Audun Boysen, 70, Norwegian middle distance runner and Olympic medalist.
Jimmy Lewis, 81, American double bassist.
Jack Robinson, 79, American baseball player.
Sandra Schmirler, 36, Canadian curling champion, cancer.
Charles E. Wiggins, 72, American politician and judge, cardiac arrest.

3
Ranjana Deshmukh, 45, Indian actress, heart attack.
Paul Doguereau, 91, French pianist and piano teacher.
Toni Ortelli, 95, Italian composer and alpinist.
Nicole Van Goethem, 58, Belgian animator and illustrator.

4
Hermann Brück, 94, German astronomer.
Władysław Daniłowski, 97, Polish-American pianist, composer and singer.
Kyi Kyi Htay, 75, Burmese actress.
Geeta Mukherjee, 76, Indian politician and social worker.
Julian Ritter, 90, American painter.
Donn J. Robertson, 83, United States Marine Corps officer.
Alphons Silbermann, 90, German Jewish sociologist, musicologist, and publicist.
Ta-You Wu, 92, Chinese theoretical physicist.
Xie Xide, 78, Chinese physicist, breast cancer.

5
Jon Barwise, 57, American mathematician, philosopher and logician, colon cancer.
Lolo Ferrari, 37, French dancer, pornographic actress, actress and singer, suicide.
Franklin Garrett, 93, American historian.
Roma Mitchell, 86, Australian lawyer and Governor of South Australia, bone cancer.
Todd Thomas, 40, American gridiron football player, cancer.
Daniel Abraham Yanofsky, 74, Canadian chess grandmaster, writer, and arbiter.
Mikola Yermalovich, 78, Belarusian writer and historian.
Alexander Young, 79, British operatic tenor.

6
S. Arumugam, 94, Ceylon Tamil engineer and writer.
Chris Balderstone, 59, English professional in cricket and football, prostate cancer.
John Colicos, 71, Canadian actor (Star Trek, Battlestar Galactica, X-Men), heart attack.
Jean-Pascal Curtillet, 57, French freestyle swimmer and Olympian.
Mirko Grmek, 76, Croatian and French historian of medicine, writer and scientist.
Ole Jacob Hansen, 59, Norwegian jazz musician (drums).
Abraham Waligo, 71, Ugandan politician, Prime Minister (1985-1986).

7
Bill Daniels, 79, American cable television executive.
Eileen Fowler, 93, English physical exercise instructor.
Charles Gray, 71, English actor, cancer.
W. D. Hamilton, 63, British evolutionary biologist, organ dysfunction.
Robert Hart, 86, English gardening pioneer.
Pee Wee King, 86, American singer-songwriter (co-wrote "Tennessee Waltz"), heart attack.
Edward H. Levi, 88, American lawyer and politician, Attorney General (1975–1977), Alzheimer's disease.
Hirokazu Ninomiya, 82, Japanese football player and manager, pneumonia.
Alimineti Madhava Reddy, 51, Indian politician, homicide.
Jack Sanford, 70, American baseball player, brain cancer.
Kazuto Tsuruoka, 83, Japanese baseball player and manager.
Byron M. Tunnell, 74, American politician.
Nicolas Walter, 65, British anarchist and atheist writer, speaker and activist.
Masami Yoshida, 41, Japanese javelin thrower.

8
Gertrude Sanford Legendre, 97, American socialite, heart attack.
Earle Gorton Linsley, 89, American entomologist.
Joe Mullaney, 75, American basketball player and coach, cancer.
Vilho Ylönen, 81, Finnish cross-country skier, rifle shooter and Olympic medalist.

9
Artyom Borovik, 39, Russian journalist and media magnate, plane crash.
Jean Coulthard, 92, Canadian composer and music educator.
Miguel Cruz, 89, Salvadoran football player.
Jim Egan, 79, Canadian LGBT rights activist, lung cancer.
Pierre Ghestem, 78, French bridge and checkers player.
Peter Hauser, 65, British football player and manager.
Pathanay Khan, Pakistan folk singer.
Usha Kiran, 70, Indian actress.
Robert Parry, 67, British politician.
Ivo Robić, 77, Croatian singer-songwriter.

10
Judith Barrett, 91, American film actress.
Barbara Cooney, 82, American author and illustrator.
Ivan Hirst, 84, British Army officer and engineer.
William Porter, 73, American track and field athlete and Olympic champion.
John Sladek, 62, American science fiction author.

11
Kazimierz Brandys, 83, Polish essayist and script writer.
Alex Dreier, 83, American news reporter and commentator, heart failure.
HB Jassin, 82, Indonesian literary critic and documentarian.
Noel Mulligan, 73, Australian rugby player.
Edgar Charles Polomé, 79, Belgian-American philologist and religious studies scholar.
Will Roberts, 92, Welsh painter.
Laureano López Rodó, 79, Spanish lawyer, diplomat and politician.
Alfred Schwarzmann, 87, German Olympic gymnast.

12
Billy Ivison, 79, British football and rugby player.
Aleksandar Nikolić, 75, Serbian basketball player and coach.
Ignatius Kung Pin-Mei, 98, Chinese Catholic Bishop of Shanghai, stomach cancer.
Mack Robinson, 85, American track and field athlete, pneumonia.

13
Harry Bright, 70, American baseball player.
Rex Everhart, 79, American actor and singer, lung cancer.
Hamid Gada, Indian commander in the militant organisation Hizbul Mujahideen, K.I.A.
Cab Kaye, 78, Ghanaian-English jazz singer and pianist.
Paramasiva Prabhakar Kumaramangalam, 86, Indian Army general.
Carlo Tagnin, 67, Italian football player and manager, cancer.
Malcolm Wilson, 86, American politician and Governor of New York.

14
Kovai Chezhiyan, 68, Indian film producer and Kongu community leader.
Tommy Collins, 69, American country musician.
C. Jérôme, 53, French singer, cancer.
Paul Smith, 54, American gridiron football player, pancreatic cancer.
Anne Wibble, 56, Swedish politician, cancer.
Ponchai Wilkerson, 28, American convicted murderer, execution by lethal injection.

15
Jaime García Añoveros, 68, American politician.
Timothy Gribble, 36, American convicted murderer and suspected serial killer, execution by lethal injection.
Clement L. Hirsch, 85, American businessman and racehorse owner, cancer.
Tomio Hora, 93, Japanese historian and academic.
Durward Kirby, 88, American television host and announcer.
Bobb McKittrick, 64, American gridiron football coach, cancer.
Darrell Keith Rich, 45, American serial killer, execution by lethal injection.
Rolf Römer, 64, German actor.
Idris Abdul Wakil, 74, Zanzibari politician, President (1985-1990).
Robert Welch, 70, English designer and silversmith.

16
Morris Berthold Abram, 81, American lawyer, civil rights activist and university president.
Ibrahim Mahmud Alfa, 53, Nigerian air marshal.
Herta Bothe, 79, German nazi concentration camp guard during World War II and war criminal.
Thomas Ferebee, 81, U.S. Army Air Forces bombardier aboard the Enola Gay, which dropped the atomic bomb on Hiroshima.
Roy Henderson, 100, British opera singer.
Pavel Prudnikau, 88, Belarusian writer.
Ivo Rinkel, 79, Dutch tennis and field hockey player.
Stanley Ralph Ross, 64, American writer and actor, lung cancer.
Michael Starr, 89, Canadian politician.
Phil Terranova, 80, American boxer.
Carlos Velázquez, 51, Puerto Rican baseball player.

17
Jack Davis, 83, Australian playwright.
Lonia Dvorin, 82, Israeli football player and coach.
Sonny Hine, 69, American thoroughbred horse trainer.
Charlie Holt, 77, American ice hockey coach, cancer.
Edward F. Knipling, 90, American entomologist.
Pete Mangum, 69, American football player.

18
Eberhard Bethge, 90, German Protestant theologian.
Pei Lisheng, 93, Chinese politician.
Glen Mervyn, 63, Canadian rower, Olympic medalist and Olympic coach, colorectal cancer.
Herman B Wells, 97, American academic.
Robert Wynn, 78, American officer with Easy Company, in the 101st Airborne Division.
Assaf Yaguri, 69, Israeli soldier and politician.

19
Graham Balcombe, 93, British cave diver.
Li Huanzhi, 81, Chinese classical composer.
Egon Jönsson, 78, Swedish football player.
Giovanni Linscheer, 27, Surinamese swimmer, car accident.
Jayne Regan, 90, American film actress.
Dewey Williams, 84, American baseball player.
Mikhail Yefremov, 88, Soviet politician and diplomat.

20
Johan Anthierens, 62, Belgian journalist, columnist, and writer, Hodgkin's disease.
Zayd Mutee' Dammaj, 57, Yemeni author and politician.
Gene Eugene, 38, Canadian actor, record producer, composer and musician.
Michael Ferris, 68, Irish politician.
Vivian Fine, 86, American composer, car collision.
Jean Howard, 89, American actress and photographer.
Ruth Kirk, 77, New Zealand anti-abortion campaigner, cancer.
Ramon Mitra, Jr., 72, Filipino statesman, diplomat, and pro-democracy activist.
Ādolfs Skulte, 90, Latvian composer and pedagogue.

21
Johan Haanes, 87, Norwegian sportsman.
Seumas McNally, 21, Canadian computer programmer and founder of DX Ball 2, Hodgkin's lymphoma.
Bai Shouyi, 91, Chinese ethnologist, historian, social activist, and writer.
Mircea Zaciu, 71, Romanian critic, literary historian and prose writer.

22
John Morrison, 2nd Viscount Dunrossil, 73, British diplomat.
Polita Grau, 84, Cuban political prisoner, First Lady.
Mark Lombardi, 48, American neo-conceptual artist, suicide by hanging.
Wayne McAllister, 92, American architect, head injury.
Carlo Parola, 78, Italian football player and coach.
Vamüzo Phesao, 62, Naga politician.
Godwin Samararatne, 67, Sri Lankan meditation teacher.

23
Ed McCurdy, 81, American folk singer, songwriter and actor.
Antony Padiyara, 79, Indian Syro Malabar prelate.
Carl Shoup, 97, American economist and public finance expert.
Udham Singh, 71, Indian field hockey player and Olympic champion.
Gert Willner, 59, German politician.

24
Albert Duncanson, 88, Canadian ice hockey player.
Robert Hugo Dunlap, 79, United States Marine Corps major.
Al Grey, 74, American jazz trombonist.
George Kirby, 66, British football player.
Kazuo Komatsubara, 56, Japanese animator, animation director and character designer.
Juan Zurita, 82, Mexican lightweight boxing world champion.

25
Jim Cash, 59, American film writer (Top Gun, Dick Tracy, Turner & Hooch), intestinal disorders.
Paul Călinescu, 97, Romanian film director and screenwriter.
Daphne Le Breton, 67, New Zealand international lawn bowler.
Helen Martin, 90, American actress, heart attack.
Eduardo Enrique Rodríguez, 81, Argentine football player.
Sandy Sanford, 83, American gridiron football player and coach.

26
Alfredo Bruniera, 93, Italian prelate of the Catholic Church.
Alex Comfort, 80, British scientist, physician and author (The Joy of Sex), cerebral haemorrhage.
Karel Thole, 85, Dutch-Italian painter and illustrator.
Len Younce, 83, American football player and coach.
Werner Zeyer, 70, German politician.

27
George Allen, 85, Canadian ice hockey player.
Ian Dury, 57, British actor and rock and roll singer (Kilburn and the High Roads, Ian Dury and the Blockheads), cancer.
Yrjö Lehtilä, 83, Finnish shot putter and Olympian.
Priya Rajvansh, 63, Indian film actress, murdered.

28
Pat Bishop, 53, Northern Irish-Australian actress.
Bill Christiansen, 86, American politician.
Christian Norberg-Schulz, 73, Norwegian architect and author.
Frances Gray Patton, 94, American short story writer and novelist.
George Petersen, 78, Australian politician.
Anthony Powell, 94, British author.
Yuri Tarasov, 39, Soviet and Ukrainian football player.
Adam Ulam, 77, Polish-American historian and political scientist, lung cancer.

29
Yevgeny Feofanov, 62, Soviet boxer and Olympic medalist.
Hans Gustav Güterbock, 91, German-American Hittitologist ang linguist.
Shirley Palmer, 91, American (silent) film actress, fall.
Anna Sokolow, 90, American dancer and choreographer.

30
George Batchelor, 80, Australian mathematician.
Salvador Abascal Infante, 90, Mexican politician.
Jean E. Karl, 72, American book publisher.
Rudolf Kirchschläger, 85, Austrian politician, President (1974-1986), cardiovascular disease.
Beryl McBurnie, 86, Trinidadian dancer.
Mihrimah Sultan, 77, Ottoman princess, granddaughter of Mehmed V.

31
Hardev Bahri, 93, Indian linguist, literary critic, and lexicographer.
Hjalmar Bergström, 93, Swedish world champion cross-country skier and Olympian.
Adrian Fisher, 47, British guitarist, myocardial infarction.
Gisèle Freund, 91, German-French photographer and photojournalist.

References 

2000-03
 03